Two Japanese destroyers have been named Hayate :

 , a  launched in 1906 and scrapped in 1924
 , a  launched in 1925 and sunk in 1941

Japanese Navy ship names
Imperial Japanese Navy ship names